is a vertical scrolling shooter video game developed by NMK and released for arcades in 1989 by UPL in Japan and by American Sammy in North America.

Gameplay
The game is a conventional scrolling shooter, in which your mission is to penetrate a hostile communist military force situated inside Russian territory. The player takes control of a Harrier fighter jet with two types of main weapons. The first type can only shoot flying opponents, such as enemy planes and copters; the second, a bomb-type weapon, can only hit ground enemies, such as tanks and turrets. The player can also acquire escorts to increase firepower. Changing the formation of the escort fighters results in different shot patterns and also affects the maneuvering speed.

See also
 Omega Fighter

Notes

References

External links
 Task Force Harrier EX game cover

1991 video games
Arcade video games
Cold War video games
NMK (company) games
Vertically scrolling shooters
Sega Genesis games
Video games developed in Japan
Video games set in the Soviet Union
Video games scored by Tenpei Sato